The Mușcel is a right tributary of the river Dâmbovița in Romania. It flows into the Dâmbovița near Malu cu Flori.

References

Rivers of Romania
Rivers of Dâmbovița County